Visa requirements for North Korean citizens are administrative entry restrictions imposed on citizens of North Korea by the authorities of other states.

As of 2 July 2019, North Korean citizens had visa-free or visa on arrival access to 39 countries and territories, ranking the North Korean passport 101st in terms of travel freedom, tied with passports issued by Bangladesh, Eritrea, Iran and Lebanon according to the Henley Passport Index.

Visa requirements map

Visa requirements

Territories
Visa requirements for citizens for visits to various territories, disputed areas and restricted zones:

Foreign travel statistics
These are the numbers of visits by North Korean citizens to various countries in 2019 (unless otherwise noted):

See also

 Visa policy of North Korea
 North Korean passport
 Citizenship in North Korea
 Nationality Law of the Democratic People's Republic of Korea
 List of nationalities forbidden at border

Notes

References 

Korea, North
Foreign relations of North Korea